Genderkingen is a municipality in the district of Donau-Ries in Bavaria in Germany. Close to the village the river Lech flows into Danube.

References

Donau-Ries
Populated places on the Danube